Roozbeh Azar (born September 20, 1980, in Mashhad) is an Iranian solo guitarist in flamenco and fusion guitarist.

Biography 
He learned Iranian traditional music under Reza Darman, Amir Moshir Falsafi, Faramarz Shokrkhah from 1988 to 1993. He learned flamenco guitar under supervision of Mansour Rasa in 1994 and he learned the principles of harmony and music composing under Mohammad Haghgou.

Honors

 Two performances in Embassy of Spain in Tehran;
 performance in Embassy of Brazil in Tehran;
 Guitar maestro in Nima Symphonic Orchestra;
 A member of jury for a music festival in Khorasan Province in 2002;
 A member of jury in the first youth music festival in Southern Khorasan Province in 2005;
 First album selected as top 5 in "beep tunes" website in 2014;
 A member of jury in the Institutional performances in Mashhad Province in 2016.

Albums
Alma ponte color de Naranja (Jan be Rang-e-Narenj)-Persian Fusion Music
Her eyes of green and voice of violet

References

External links 
 

 Roozbeh Azar on SoundCloud

1980 births
Living people
21st-century guitarists
21st-century Iranian male singers
Iranian singer-songwriters
Iranian composers
Iranian guitarists
Iranian pop singers
Iranian pop musicians